The Colo Wars was a series of skirmishes against the British occupation of Fiji in the 1870s, led by the Colo tribe.

It was noted that even tribes fighting on the British side refrained from severely damaging Colo society, knowing the tribe would reconcile after the conflict.

References

1870s conflicts
History of Fiji
Colony of Fiji